40 Crescent Street is a historic house in Wakefield, Massachusetts, and is significant as a particularly fine example of a Greek Revival style house.

Description and history 
Built in 1839, the -story wood-frame house has a roof that is cantilevered over the front of the house, where it is supported by Doric columns. Doors and windows both have architrave surrounds, and both the front door and the side door have sidelight windows. The house was built by Abel Hutchinson, a shoemaker, and remains in the hands of his descendants.

The house was listed on the National Register of Historic Places on July 6, 1989.

See also
National Register of Historic Places listings in Wakefield, Massachusetts
National Register of Historic Places listings in Middlesex County, Massachusetts

References

Houses on the National Register of Historic Places in Wakefield, Massachusetts
Houses completed in 1839
Houses in Wakefield, Massachusetts
Greek Revival architecture in Massachusetts